Ribonuclease P protein subunit p30 is an enzyme that in humans is encoded by the RPP30 gene.

References

Further reading